Bad Idea may refer to:
 Bad Idea (magazine), a British general interest magazine
 "Bad Idea" (Ariana Grande song), a 2019 song by Ariana Grande
 "Bad Idea" (YBN Cordae song), a 2019 song by YBN Cordae featuring Chance the Rapper
 "Bad Idea", a 1997 song by A from How Ace Are Buildings
 "Bad Idea", a 2015 song by Sara Bareilles from What's Inside: Songs from Waitress
 "Bad Idea!", a 2019 song by Girl in Red
 "Bad Idea", a 2022 song by Blind Channel
 "Bad Idea", a 2022 song by Dove Cameron

See also 
Bad Ideas (disambiguation)